Lyall "Laurie" Bolton (11 July 1932 – 8 August 2018) was an English professional footballer who played as a wing half for Sunderland.

References

1932 births
Footballers from Gateshead
English footballers
Association football wing halves
Sunderland A.F.C. players
Chelmsford City F.C. players
English Football League players
2018 deaths